Victory is a 2009 Indian cricket-based sports film starring Harman Baweja, Amrita Rao and Anupam Kher. It is Harman Baweja's second release after his debut film Love Story 2050, which performed very badly at the box office. The movie was filmed in Australia and India. Victory tells the story of a struggling cricketer who defies all odds to realise an almost impossible dream.

Plot
This cricket epic story revolves around the life of Vijay Shekhawat (Harman Baweja) and his father Ram Shekhawat (Anupam Kher). Ram has great aspirations for his son Vijay but alas he dreams of playing for the Indian cricket team one day. His dream eventually comes true when Vijay makes it to the Indian team. His childhood friend Nandini (Amrita Rao) has believed in him since the very first time he spoke the name of cricket and never ever doubted him. However, this happiness is short-lived as Vijay soon loses his place in the team, as well as the respect he has earned, when he lets his new-found fame get the better of him.

Vijay soon discovers how quickly the media and the public can make a villain out of a hero. Unable to bear the shock and humiliation, Ram suffers a brain hemorrhage. Nandini takes the responsibility to care for Ram and take in Vijay. Vijay and Nandini fly to Australia to have surgery on his back. The surgery is successful and Vijay soon realises that Nandini, his childhood friend, could be his life partner. He nurtures his feelings for her but Nandini is still healing after Vijay's bad side took over and is finding it hard to trust him and behave like his true friend again. They return to Jaisalmer and Vijay vows to be a better cricketer for his country. He proves himself to his father and Nandini that he can play for his country and his coach relies on him too. He gets selected once again to play in the major international cricket tournament. He injures himself while playing but vows to play no matter his health. He wins the cricket tournament and returns to his hometown Jaisalmer, to see his father and Nandini. Vijay and his father reconcile and just when everything is going fine Ram dies in Vijay's arms. They hold the funeral and we see Vijay and Nandini comforting each other in the end scene. We assume they get together. And it finishes with Vijay once again playing in a cricket match and playing for his country.

Cast

Cameo appearances
Victory is notable for special appearances by several current and past international cricketers from India, Pakistan, Australia, South Africa, Sri Lanka, New Zealand and England. This has been done to give the film an authentic look and feel. Some of the cricketers featured include:

 Neel Shah
 Mohinder Amarnath
 Rao Iftikhar Anjum
 Allan Border
 Stuart Clark
 Martin Crowe
 Dilhara Fernando
 Brad Haddin
 Brad Hogg
 Mike Hussey
 Sanath Jayasuriya
 Dean Jones
 Simon Jones
 Suresh Raina
 Rohit Sharma
 Virat Kohli
 Dinesh Karthik
 Praveen Kumar
 Brett Lee
 Farveez Maharoof
 Sajid Mahmood
 Shoaib Malik
 Dimitri Mascarenhas
 Ajantha Mendis
 Albie Morkel
 Morné Morkel
 Muttiah Muralitharan
 Ashish Nehra
 André Nel
 Yusuf Pathan
 Ramesh Powar
 Kumar Sangakkara
 Ishant Sharma
 Navjot Singh Sidhu
 Harbhajan Singh
 Maninder Singh
 RP Singh
 Michael Slater
 Graeme Smith
 Pat Symcox
 Sohail Tanvir
 Chaminda Vaas
 Atul Wassan
 Waqar Younis
AB De Villiers

Production
Victory has been produced by Manmohan Shetty and AjitPal Mangat under the banner of Walkwater Media and Moving Pictures, and directed by AjitPal Mangat. It was released on 16 January 2009.

Soundtrack

Reception
The film faced competition from other films such Raaz 2 and Dev D and failed to do well. With a huge budget it only managed to gross 1.9 Crore and was declared a disaster by boxoffice-india. It was Harman Baweja's second film which failed to do well at the box office. The film was also criticised by the cricketers who made cameo appearances.

References

External links

Victory Moving Pictures

2000s Hindi-language films
Films about cricket in India
2009 films
Films scored by Anu Malik
Films shot in Sri Lanka